Two Mexican radio stations bear the XHRE-FM callsign:

XHRE-FM (Coahuila), 105.5 FM "Exa FM" in Piedras Negras, Coahuila
XHRE-FM (Guanajuato), 88.1 FM "La Comadre" in Celaya, Guanajuato (combo with XERE-AM)